Yoon Jung-hee (born December 21, 1980) is a South Korean actress. Yoon was the representative of Gyeonggi Province at the Miss Korea beauty pageant in 2000, then lived in obscurity for several years while trying to find work as an actress. She made her breakthrough in 2005 in the hit drama Dear Heaven, followed by more leading roles on television, including Blissful Woman (2007), and Family's Honor (2008). She also starred in the horror film Death Bell (2008).

Philanthropy 
On March 7, 2022, Lee donated 50 million won to the Hope Bridge Disaster Relief Association to help the victims of the massive wildfire that started in Uljin, Gyeongbuk and has spread to Samcheok, Gangwon.

Filmography

Television drama

Film

Variety show

Music video

Awards and nominations

References

External links 

  
 
 
 

1980 births
Living people
Miss Korea delegates
South Korean television actresses
South Korean film actresses